Acronia gloriosa is a species of beetle in the family Cerambycidae. It was described by Arnold Schultze in 1922, originally under the genus Euclea. It is known from the Philippines.

References

Acronia
Beetles described in 1922